Sir James Milne, K.C.V.O., C.S.I. (4 May 1883 – 1 April 1958), was an Irish railway manager in Great Britain. He was General Manager of the Great Western Railway (GWR) from 1929 to 1947, and also deputy chairman of the Railway Executive Committee (REC) from 1938 to 1947.

Early life

Milne was born in Dublin, Ireland, in 1883. He attended Campbell College in Belfast and later moved to Great Britain to study Engineering at the Victoria University of Manchester, graduating in 1904.

GWR

Milne joined the GWR 1904 as a pupil engineer (training to be a locomotive engineer) in the locomotive department. He later moved to Paddington and gained operational and traffic experience. In 1912 Milne married Nora Rebekah Morse, daughter of Levi Lapper Morse.

Government work

Milne joined the Ministry of Transport when it was set up in 1919 as Director of Statistics until 1921. He also served on the Geddes Committee on National Expenditure (1921–22) and the India Retrenchment Committee (1922–23), which was chaired by Lord Inchcape. Milne was appointed Companion of the Order of the Star of India (CSI) in 1923.

Return to GWR

Milne returned to the GWR as assistant general manager (to Sir Felix Pole) in 1922, and replaced Pole as General Manager in 1929. He continued Pole's work on the GWR's advertising and corporate image, introducing the Gill Sans typeface in advertising and the GWR monogram on advertising and rolling stock. He was knighted in 1932, and appointed Knight Commander of the Royal Victorian Order (KCVO) in 1936.

During his tenure he helped set up Railway Air Services, a joint venture between the major British railway companies and Imperial Airways. The GWR also investigated electrification but thought it not suitable or economic for its network.

From 1938 Milne continued as General Manager but was also deputy chairman of the Railway Executive Committee (REC), a government body responsible for running British railways during the Second World War. Milne was also a member of the Road Transport (Defence) Advisory Committee (1938). The REC's work continued after the end of the war through to nationalisation in 1948. In 1940 Milne was elected as a GWR director but could not take up the role as the REC was a government body.

On 29 July 1944 Paddington station had to be closed because of large crowds trying to leave London for the August Bank holiday and to escape flying bombs. The GWR had locomotives and coaches available, but were not allowed to run extra trains because of wartime restrictions. Milne had to threaten to involve the Prime Minister, Winston Churchill, before the Ministry of War Transport relented and allowed the extra trains to run.

Retirement

Milne strongly opposed state ownership of the railways, but was still offered the chairmanship of the Railway Executive of the British Transport Commission (BTC), which was being formed to manage the proposed nationalised British Railways. Milne declined the offer and retired from the GWR at the end of 1947.

In 1948 an ex-GWR locomotive, Castle class No. 7001 Denbigh Castle, was renamed as No. 7001 Sir James Milne. Milne died in 1958.

References

Sources

External links
Photograph of James Milne

1883 births
1958 deaths
Great Western Railway people
Engineers from Dublin (city)
People educated at Campbell College
Knights Commander of the Royal Victorian Order
Alumni of the Victoria University of Manchester